Bilkiss Islam is a Bangladesh Nationalist Party politician and the former Member of the Bangladesh Parliament from a reserved seat.

Career
Islam was elected to parliament from reserved seat as a Bangladesh Nationalist Party candidate in 2005.

References

Bangladesh Nationalist Party politicians
Living people
Women members of the Jatiya Sangsad
8th Jatiya Sangsad members
Year of birth missing (living people)
21st-century Bangladeshi women politicians